Two ships of the United States Navy have been named USS Bell, in honor of Rear Admiral Henry Haywood Bell.

 , was a Wickes-class destroyer.
 , was a Fletcher-class destroyer from 1943 to 1946.

See also

Sources

United States Navy ship names